The following is a list of individuals associated with Hampshire College through attending as a student, or serving as a member of the faculty or staff.

Notable alumni

Academia
Alba Arikha, writer, lecturer on creative writing at the University of Hertfordshire and Columbia University
Sylvia Bashevkin, Canadian academic and feminist at the University of Toronto, former Principal of University College, Toronto
George Bonanno, psychologist, Columbia University
Derek Blake Booth, geologist and heir presumptive to the Booth baronetcy, University of Washington
Heather Boushey, economist, president of the Washington Center for Equitable Growth think tank
Cynthia Cattell, space physicist and professor in the School of Physics and Astronomy at University of Minnesota
Hasok Chang, historian and philosopher of science, University of Cambridge
Barry Marc Cohen, art therapist, Diagnostic Drawing Series
Phyllis Coley, biologist, University of Utah
Concetta DiRusso, biochemist, University of Nebraska-Lincoln
Paige Fischer, environmental scientist, University of Michigan
Vanessa Northington Gamble, physician, professor of medical humanities at George Washington University, chair of the Tuskegee Syphilis Study Legacy Committee
Raymond W. Gibbs Jr., psychologist and psycholinguist, University of California, Santa Cruz
Nancy Grimm, ecologist, Arizona State University
Marcia Groszek, mathematician, Dartmouth College
Gail Hershatter, historian of Modern China at the University of California, Santa Cruz and Williams College, Guggenheim Fellow
Benjamin Mako Hill, technologist, software developer and founding member of Ubuntu and Debian projects, assistant professor in Communication at the University of Washington
Sean Hill, neuroscientist, University of Toronto
Tom Hull, mathematician and professor, Western New England University
Mary James, physicist, Reed College, University of Maryland, College Park
Caren Kaplan, feminist theorist, professor of American studies at University of California at Davis, University of California at Berkeley, Georgetown University
Patricia Klindienst, writer and scholar, American Book Award recipient, Yale University
Lucy-Ann McFadden, astronomer and planetary scientist for NASA, founder of the Science, Discovery & the Universe Program at the University of Maryland
Jacob Reider, expert in health information technology policy and National Coordinator for Health Information Technology
G. Philip Robertson, biologist, Michigan State University
David Schimel, research scientist at NASA's Jet Propulsion Lab, California Institute of Technology; Nobel Peace Prize laureate
Timothy Shary, film scholar, University of Massachusetts Amherst, Clark University
Lee Smolin, theoretical physicist at the Perimeter Institute, University of Waterloo and University of Toronto, author of The Trouble with Physics
Eric Steig, glaciologist and geochemist, professor of Earth and Space sciences at the University of Washington
Paul W. Sternberg, biologist, California Institute of Technology
Alex S. Vitale, sociologist at Brooklyn College, author of The End of Policing (2017)
Timothy Wilson, Sherrell J. Aston Professor of Psychology, University of Virginia
William H. Warren, psychologist, Chancellor's Professor at Brown University
Christopher Young, composer, professor of music at the University of Southern California

Activism
Joseph Amon, epidemiologist, human rights activist at Human Rights Watch
Chuck Collins, political activist, co-founder of United For a Fair Economy
Melissa Hoffer, environmental lawyer and Director of the New Hampshire Advocacy Center for the Conservation Law Foundation
Shalini Kantayya, documentary filmmaker and environmental activist, Catching the Sun
Alia Amirali, Pakistani politician and activist
Lisa Shannon, author, human rights activist, and speaker

Arts & Design

Mequitta Ahuja, feminist painter, Guggenheim Fellow
Math Bass, artist
Gideon Bok, painter, Guggenheim Fellow
Leidy Churchman, painter
Barry Marc Cohen, art therapist, Diagnostic Drawing Series
E.V. DAY, artist
Angela Ellsworth, artist
Peter Harkawik, artist
Every Ocean Hughes (formerly known as Emily Roysdon), visual artist
Jeph Jacques, artist, Questionable Content
Emma Kohlmann, curator and artist
Jane Marsching, artist
Susan Mikula, artist and photographer
Christina Quarles, artist
Kanishka Raja, visual artist
Raghavendra Rathore, Indian fashion designer
Steven Siegel, sculptor and installation artist

Photography 

 Doug DuBois, photographer, Guggenheim Fellow
 James Estrin, New York Times senior staff photographer, Pulitzer Prize recipient
 Jane Marsching, interdisciplinary digital artist
 Susan Mikula, artist and photographer

Writers and authors

Lisa Arie, author and motivational speaker, CEO of Vista Caballo
Alba Arikha, French writer, author of Major/Minor, goddaughter of Samuel Beckett
Daniel Asia, composer, Guggenheim Fellow, music and culture contributor at the Huffington Post
Eula Biss, author, Guggenheim Fellow
Cylin Busby, best-selling author and screenwriter
David Callahan, founder and editor of Inside Philanthropy
Rebecca Carroll, writer, editor, and radio producer; former managing editor at xoJane and founding editor of Africana.com
Leah Hager Cohen, writer
Kanya D'Almeida, writer and journalist
Ethan Gilsdorf, writer and journalist, The New York Times, Boston Globe, Wired, Salon
Eli Gottlieb, novelist, author of The Boy Who Went Away
Suzanne Greenberg, writer
David M. Hall, writer and corporate trainer, author of Allies at Work
Gabrielle Hamilton, chef and author
Ellis Henican, Newsday columnist, Fox News Channel political analyst, New York Times Bestselling author
Patricia Klindienst, writer and scholar, American Book Award recipient
Jon Krakauer, mountain climber and writer, New York Times bestselling author of Into The Wild
Lê Thi Diem Thúy, writer and solo performance artist, Guggenheim Fellow
Daniel Marcus, science fiction author
Gary Marcus, cognitive scientist, founder and CEO of Geometric Intelligence, New York Times bestselling author
Daniel José Older, fantasy and young adult fiction writer
Liz Perle, co-founder and editor-in-chief of Common Sense Media
Jennifer Pozner, author, media critic, femist
John Reed, novelist
Lisa Shannon, author, human rights activist, and speaker
Timothy Shary, film scholar
Sonya Sones, poet and writer for young adults, author of What My Mother Doesn't Know
Doug Stanton, journalist and New York Times best-selling author
Thomas H. Stoner, Jr., author and energy entrepreneur, CEO of Entelligent
Gwen Strauss, writer and author
Sander Thoenes, journalist
Maggie Thrash, writer of young adult fiction, Honor Girl
Alex S. Vitale, sociologist, author of The End of Policing
Jessamyn West, librarian and blogger, creator of Librarian.net
Dede Wilson, baker, contributing editor of Bon Appetit, cookbook author
Torrey Peters, writer, author of Detransition, Baby

Poets 

 Janet Aalfs, poet laureate of Northampton, Massachusetts and martial artist
 Joshua Beckman, poet
S. Bear Bergman, poet
Chen Chen, poet
Peter Cole, poet and MacArthur Fellowship recipient
Ethan Gilsdorf, writer, poet, and journalist, The New York Times, Boston Globe, Wired, Salon
Cyrée Jarelle Johnson, poet, co-founder of Deaf Poets Society magazine, Lambda Literary Award-winner for Slingshot
Robin Coste Lewis, poet laureate of Los Angeles, National Book Award winner for Voyage of the Sable Venus
Sonya Sones, poet and writer for young adults, author of What My Mother Doesn't Know

Journalists 

 Tina Antolini, journalist and radio producer for NPR
Madeleine Baran, Peabody Award-winning investigative reporter and host of the podcast In the Dark
 Suzanne Daley, journalist for The New York Times
 Ethan Gilsdorf, writer, poet, and journalist, The New York Times, Boston Globe, Wired, Salon
 Ellis Henican, Newsday columnist, Fox News Channel political analyst, New York Times Bestselling author
 Edward Humes, Pulitzer Prize-winning journalist
 Fariba Nawa, journalist and author
 Amy K. Nelson, journalist, Slate, Deadspin, ESPN
 Jeff Sharlet, journalist, Harper's, Rolling Stone
 Doug Stanton, journalist and New York Times best-selling author
 Sander Thoenes, journalist

Tabletop and video games 
Meguey Baker, role-playing game designer, independent publisher and quilt historian
Vincent Baker, role-playing game designer and publisher
Noah Falstein, video game designer and producer for LucasArts, DreamWorks Interactive, and The 3DO Company; president of The Inspiracy
Daniel Licht, composer of films and video games, Dexter, Silent Hill

Theater 

Dennis Boutsikaris, Obie Award-winning actor
Fred Melamed, Independent Spirit Award-winning actor
Lupita Nyong'o, Academy Award-winning actress, Tony Award-nominee for Eclipsed
Liev Schreiber, stage and screen actor, star of Emmy-winning series Ray Donovan, Tony Award-winner
Andrea Stolowitz, playwright
Naomi Wallace, playwright and MacArthur Fellowship recipient

Dance & Performance 
Stephen Petronio, choreographer, Guggenheim Fellow

Film, television, and entertainment

Chris Applebaum, music video director
Lesley Arfin, author and staff writer for Girls and Brooklyn Nine-Nine, former Vice contributor
Ken Burns, Emmy and Peabody Award-winning documentary filmmaker, The Civil War
Cylin Busby, best-selling author and screenwriter
Greg Butler, Academy Award-winning visual effects supervisor, Forrest Gump, Harry Potter and the Deathly Hallows - Part 2, 1917
Charlie Clouser, musician and composer for film and television, former member of Nine Inch Nails
Rhys Ernst, film producer and director, Adam, Transparent
John Falsey, Emmy Award-winning television creator of St. Elsewhere, I'll Fly Away and Northern Exposure
Victor Fresco, television writer and producer, creator of Andy Richter Controls the Universe, Better Off Ted and Santa Clarita Diet
Sarah Goldfinger, television writer/producer
Lee Hirsch, filmmaker, Amandla!: A Revolution in Four-Part Harmony, Bully
Rolfe Kanefsky, filmmaker
Daniel Licht, composer of films and video games, Dexter, Silent Hill
Billy Luther, documentary filmmaker, Miss Navajo
Jeff Maguire, screenwriter, In The Line of Fire, Escape to Victory
Brett Morgen, Emmy-winning documentary filmmaker, Jane, Kurt Cobain: Montage of Heck
Andrea Pallaoro, film director and screenwriter
Will Reiser, screenwriter and producer, 50/50
Alex Rivera, filmmaker, Sleep Dealer
Rod Roddenberry, television producer and CEO of Roddenberry Entertainment, son of Star Trek creator Gene Roddenberry
Kelly Sears, animator and filmmaker
Roger Sherman, Emmy and Peabody Award-winning filmmaker
Max Simonet, co-creator and host of talk show FishCenter Live
Barry Sonnenfeld, director of The Addams Family, Men in Black trilogy, Wild Wild West and Get Shorty
Wes Takahashi, visual effects supervisor and animator for the Back To The Future trilogy, Top Gun, The Goonies; creator of the DreamWorks "boy on the moon" logo
Christopher Young, film composer, Hellraiser, The Grudge, Spider-Man 3
Teo Žagar, filmmaker and member of the Vermont House of Representatives
Tiya Tejpal, Production Designer for The Rapist, Raman Raghav 2.0

Actors 

 Xander Berkeley, actor, Terminator 2, Candyman, The Walking Dead, 24
 Dennis Boutsikaris, actor, The Bourne Legacy, Better Call Saul
 Julie Dretzin, actress, Breaking Bad, The Handmaid's Tale
 Adelind Horan, actress, The Deuce
 Fred Melamed, actor, A Serious Man, Lady Dynamite, WandaVision, Barry, Independent Spirit Award-winner
 Eugene Mirman, stand-up comedian and actor, Bob's Burgers, Declocated
 David Moscow, actor, Big
 Lupita Nyong'o, Academy Award-winning actress, 12 Years a Slave, Us
 Jason Salkey, actor
 Liev Schreiber, stage and screen actor, star of Emmy-winning series Ray Donovan, Tony Award-winner
 Joshua Seth, voice actor, Digimon, Akira
 Aamina Sheikh, Pakistani actress and supermodel
 Max Simonet, co-creator and host of talk show FishCenter Live
 Danny Tamberelli, actor known for The Adventures of Pete & Pete, cast member of All That

Politicians, diplomats, and other government officials
Alia Amirali, Pakistani politician and activist
Heather Boushey, economist, president of the Washington Center for Equitable Growth think tank, economic advisor to Hillary Clinton and Joe Biden
Eileen Brady, candidate for mayor of Portland, Oregon
Maud Daudon, CEO of the Seattle Metropolitan Chamber of Commerce
Tooker Gomberg, Canadian politician and environmental activist
Kenneth Green, politician and social worker, member of the Connecticut House of Representatives
Petros S. Kokkalis, businessman and member of the European Parliament
Dawn M. Liberi, diplomat and former U.S. Ambassador to Burundi under Barack Obama
Jacob Reider, expert in health information technology policy and National Coordinator for Health Information Technology under Barack Obama
Brenda Siegel, Democratic nominee in the 2022 Vermont gubernatorial election
David Shulkin, physician and 9th United States Secretary of Veterans Affairs
Teo Žagar, filmmaker and member of the Vermont House of Representatives

Musicians

Bob Bralove, musician best known for his work with the Grateful Dead
Pam Bricker, jazz singer, professor of music, and musical collaborator with Thievery Corporation
Charlie Clouser, musician and composer for film and television, former member of Nine Inch Nails
Amy Denio, composer
Toby Driver, musician and artist, Kayo Dot and Maudlin of the Well
Ed Droste, singer/songwriter from the Brooklyn-based indie group Grizzly Bear (band)
Neil Gust, musician and artist, Heatmiser
Tom Hanway, bluegrass and Celtic banjoist
Mike Ladd, Hip Hop MC and member of the Antipop Consortium
Ken Leavitt-Lawrence, rap artist a.k.a. "MC Hawking"
Daniel Lopatin, musician known as Oneohtrix Point Never
Matt Mondanile, musician, Ducktails & Real Estate
Elliott Smith, Academy Award-nominated indie-folk musician, singer-songwriter, and multi-instrumentalist
Zachary Cole Smith, musician, frontman of DIIV
Supreme Dicks, lo-fi and experimental band
Autre Ne Veut, musician
Michael "Mudcat" Ward, blues bassist, pianist and songwriter
Erica Wheeler, singer-songwriter
Orchid, hardcore punk band

Composers 

 Daniel Asia, composer, Guggenheim Fellow, music and culture contributor at the Huffington Post
 Charlie Clouser, musician and composer for film and television, former member of Nine Inch Nails
 Daniel Licht, composer of films and video games, Dexter, Silent Hill franchise
 Christopher Young, film composer, Hellraiser, The Grudge, Spiderman 3

Business

Lisa Arie, author and motivational speaker, CEO of Vista Caballo
Nicholas Callaway, founder of Callaway Arts & Entertainment
James Crown, president of Henry Crown and Company, director of JPMorgan Chase & Co., General Dynamics and Sara Lee
Jose Fuentes, co-founder/developer of Duolingo
David M. Hall, writer and corporate trainer, author of Allies at Work
Benjamin Mako Hill, technologist, software developer and founding member of Ubuntu and Debian projects, assistant professor in Communication at the University of Washington
Gary Hirshberg, Chairman, President, and "CE-Yo" of Stonyfield Farm
Jeffrey Hollender, President and CEO of Seventh Generation Inc.
Mark Kriegsman, computer programmer and Director of Engineering at Veracode
Aaron Lansky, founder of the National Yiddish Book Center, MacArthur Fellow
Chris Lavergne, founder of the website Thought Catalog
Gary Marcus, cognitive scientist, founder and CEO of Geometric Intelligence, New York Times bestselling author
Nicholas Merrill, computer programmer and entrepreneur, founder of The Calyx Institute and plaintiff in the legal case Doe v. Ashcroft
Liz Perle, co-founder and editor-in-chief of Common Sense Media
Thomas H. Stoner, Jr., author and energy entrepreneur, CEO of Entelligent

Law
Melissa Hoffer, environmental lawyer and Director of the New Hampshire Advocacy Center for the Conservation Law Foundation
Daniel Horowitz, high-profile criminal-defense attorney
Kathryn Tucker, high-profile attorney and executive director of the End of Life Liberty Project

Other notable alumni
Elizabeth Armstrong, art curator
Johnny Dwork, two-time world champion flying disc freestyle athlete

Chefs 

 Gabrielle Hamilton, chef and author
 Dede Wilson, baker, contributing editor of Bon Appetit, cookbook author

Fictional alumni
 Alice Kinnon (Chloë Sevigny), lead character from the film The Last Days of Disco
 Charlotte Pingress (Kate Beckinsale), lead character from the film The Last Days of Disco 
 Gobi (Horatio Sanz), character on the reoccurring Saturday Night Live sketch Jarret's Room
 Jarret (Jimmy Fallon), character on the reoccurring Saturday Night Live sketch Jarret's Room

Hampshire College Summer Studies in Mathematics alumni 
 Bram Cohen, original author and developer of BitTorrent
 Matthew Cook, group leader at the Institute for Neuroinformatics at ETH Zurich and computer scientist who proved the Turing universality of Wolfram's Rule 110 cellular automaton
 Lenore Cowen, computer scientist and mathematician at Tufts University
 Alan Edelman, professor of mathematics at the Massachusetts Institute of Technology
 Alan Grayson, former member of the U.S. House of Representatives (D-Florida)
 Neil Immerman, professor of computer science at the University of Massachusetts Amherst
 Susan Landau,  professor of cybersecurity and policy at Tufts University, visiting scholar of computer science at Harvard University, Guggenheim Fellow
 Eric Lander,  mathematician and geneticist, professor of biology at the Massachusetts Institute of Technology and science advisor to President Barack Obama, MacArthur Fellow
 Adam Marcus, professor of mathematics at Princeton University
 Cathy O'Neil, data scientist and blogger at Mathbabe,  Director of the Lede Program in Data Practices at Columbia University
 Jim Propp, professor of mathematics at the University of Massachusetts Lowell
 Dana Randall, professor of computer science at Georgia Tech
 Lisa Randall,  Frank B. Baird, Jr. Professor of Science at Harvard University, known for developing the Randall–Sundrum model
 Seth Schoen, technologist at the Electronic Frontier Foundation
 Steven Strogatz, Professor of Applied Mathematics at Cornell University
 Eugene Volokh, Gary T. Schwartz Professor of Law at UCLA Law School, scholar of American constitutional law and libertarianism
 Erik Winfree, professor of computer science and bioengineering at the California Institute of Technology, MacArthur Fellow

Notable past and present faculty

Film and video 

 Joan Braderman, video artist and director, MacArthur Fellow
 Bill Brand, experimental filmmaker
 Jacqueline Hayden, feminist photographer and video artist
 Peter Hutton (filmmaker), experimental filmmaker
 Penny Lane (filmmaker), documentary filmmaker
 Jerome Liebling, filmmaker and photographer, Guggenheim Fellow
 Kara Lynch, video artist
 Elaine Mayes, filmmaker and photographer, Guggenheim Fellow
 Julia Meltzer, video artist, Guggenheim Fellow
 Walid Raad/Atlas Group, video and multi-media artist
 Ellen Spiro, Emmy Award-winning documentary filmmaker

Photography 

 Diane Arbus, photographer, Guggenheim Fellow
 Jerome Liebling, filmmaker and photographer, Guggenheim Fellow
 Elaine Mayes, filmmaker and photographer, Guggenheim Fellow
 Carrie Mae Weems, photographer, MacArthur Fellow

Visual arts 

 Leonard Baskin, graphic artist and sculptor, Guggenheim Fellow
 David Diao, painter

Theater 

 Josephine Abady, theater director

Music 

 Ray Copeland, jazz musician
 Mark Dresser, jazz musician
 Marty Ehrlich, jazz musician
 Yusef Lateef, jazz musician, Grammy Award-winner
 Roland Wiggins, music theorist, music teacher to John Coltrane, Thelonious Monk, Yusef Lateef, Buster Williams, Jimmy Owens, and Billy Taylor

Politics 
Eqbal Ahmad, political scientist, writer and academic
Michael Klare, scholar on U.S. defense policy and global resource issues

History 
Anson Rabinbach, historian of modern Europe, co-founder of New German Critique, Guggenheim Fellow
E. Francis White, historian

Anthropology 
Alan H. Goodman, anthropologist
Aihwa Ong, anthropologist, MacArthur Fellow
Leonard Glick, anthropologist, historian of ideas and Judaism

Psychology 
John Roosevelt Boettiger, psychologist, grandson of Franklin D. Roosevelt

Writing and Journalism 
James Baldwin, novelist, essayist, poet, playwright and activist
Ronnie Dugger, journalist, Harper's Magazine, The Nation, The New Yorker, founder of The Texas Observer, George Polk Award-winner
David Anthony Durham, historical and epic fantasy novelist
Lynne Hanley, literary critic and feminist
Norton Juster, architect and writer, author of The Phantom Tollbooth
Michael Lesy, writer and literary journalist, author of Wisconsin Death Trip
Elinor Lipman, novelist, short story writer, and essayist
David Roberts, mountaineer and author
Andrew Salkey, writer
Eric Schocket, American studies and literature scholar
Helaine Selin, librarian, author, and editor

Poetry 
Polina Barskova, poet
Aracelis Girmay, poet
Paul Jenkins, professor of poetry
John Murillo, poet
Chase Twichell, poet, Guggenheim Fellow

Mathematics and Science 
Raymond Coppinger, professor of biology and cognitive science
David Kelly, professor of mathematics
Eric Lander, mathematician and geneticist, MacArthur Fellow
Margaret M. Robinson, mathematician

Ecology 

 Arthur H. Westing, professor of ecology and dean of the School of Natural Science, Guggenheim Fellow

Other 
Ngawang Samten, Tibetologist
Robert Sanborn, activist and President/CEO of Children At Risk
Jonathan Westphal, professor of philosophy

Presidents 

 Franklin Patterson (1966–1971), first president of Hampshire College and co-author of the New College Plan
 Charles R. Longsworth (1971–1977), current director of Saul Centers, Inc., former President, CEO, and Chairman of The Colonial Williamsburg Foundation
 Adele S. Simmons (1977–1989), former President of the MacArthur Foundation and first female dean of student affairs at Princeton University
 Gregory S. Prince, Jr. (1989–2005), chairman of the Association of Independent Colleges and Universities in Massachusetts and vice-chair of the Council on Racial and Ethnic Justice of the American Bar Association
 Ralph J. Hexter (2005–2010), former dean at UC Berkeley and Acting Chancellor of UC Davis, founding member of LGBTQ Presidents in Higher Education
 Marlene Gerber Fried (2010–2011) (interim)
 Jonathan Lash (2011–2018), attorney, member of the board of directors and former president of the World Resources Institute
 Miriam E. Nelson (2018–2019), acting president and CEO of Newman's Own Foundation, best-selling author, and nutricianist 
 Kenneth Rosenthal (2019) (interim)
 Edward Wingenbach (2019–present), former acting president of Ripon College

References 

Hampshire College
Hampshire College alumni
Hampshire College faculty